René François Ghislain Magritte (21 November 1898 – 15 August 1967) was a Belgian surrealist artist known for his depictions of familiar objects in unfamiliar, unexpected contexts, which often provoked questions about the nature and boundaries of reality and representation. His imagery has influenced pop art, minimalist art, and conceptual art.

Early life
René Magritte was born in Lessines, in the province of Hainaut, Belgium, in 1898. He was the oldest son of Léopold Magritte, a tailor and textile merchant, and Régina (née Bertinchamps), who was a milliner before she got married. Little is known about Magritte's early life. He began lessons in drawing in 1910.

On 24 February 1912, his mother committed suicide by drowning herself in the River Sambre at Châtelet. It was not her first suicide attempt. Her body was not discovered until 12 March. According to a legend, 13-year-old Magritte was present when her body was retrieved from the water, but recent research has discredited this story, which may have originated with the family nurse. Supposedly, when his mother was found, her dress was covering her face, an image that has been suggested as the source of several of Magritte's paintings in 1927–1928 of people with cloth obscuring their faces, including Les Amants.

Career
Magritte's earliest paintings, which date from about 1915, were Impressionistic in style. During 1916–1918, he studied at the Académie Royale des Beaux-Arts in Brussels, under Constant Montald, but found the instruction uninspiring. He also took classes at the Académie Royale from the painter and poster designer Gisbert Combaz. The paintings he produced during 1918–1924 were influenced by Futurism and by the figurative Cubism of Metzinger. 

From December 1920 until September 1921, Magritte served in the Belgian infantry in the Flemish town of Beverlo near Leopoldsburg.  In 1922, Magritte married Georgette Berger, whom he had met as a child in 1913. Also during 1922, the poet Marcel Lecomte showed Magritte a reproduction of Giorgio de Chirico's The Song of Love (painted in 1914).  The work brought Magritte to tears; he described this as "one of the most moving moments of my life: my eyes saw thought for the first time." The paintings of the Belgian symbolist painter William Degouve de Nuncques have also been noted as an influence on Magritte, specifically the former's painting The Blind House (1892) and Magritte's variations or series on The Empire of Lights.

In 1922–1923, Magritte worked as a draughtsman in a wallpaper factory, and was a poster and advertisement designer until 1926, when a contract with Galerie Le Centaure in Brussels made it possible for him to paint full-time. In 1926, Magritte produced his first surreal painting, The Lost Jockey (Le jockey perdu), and held his first solo exhibition in Brussels in 1927. Critics heaped abuse on the exhibition.

Depressed by the failure, he moved to Paris where he became friends with André Breton and became involved in the Surrealist group. An illusionistic, dream-like quality is characteristic of Magritte's version of Surrealism. He became a leading member of the movement, and remained in Paris for three years. In 1929, he exhibited at Goemans Gallery in Paris with Salvador Dalí, Jean Arp, de Chirico, Max Ernst, Joan Miró, Picabia, Picasso and Yves Tanguy.

On 15 December 1929, Magritte participated in the last publication of La Revolution Surrealiste No. 12, where he published his essay "Les mots et les images", where words play with images in sync with his work The Treachery of Images.

Galerie Le Centaure closed at the end of 1929, ending Magritte's contract income. Having made little impact in Paris, Magritte returned to Brussels in 1930 and resumed working in advertising. He and his brother, Paul, formed an agency which earned him a living wage. In 1932, Magritte joined the Communist Party, which he would periodically leave and rejoin for several years. In 1936 he had his first solo exhibition in the United States at the Julien Levy Gallery in New York, followed by an exposition at the London Gallery in 1938.

Between 1934 and 1937, Magritte drew film posters under the pseudonym 'Emair' for the German sound film distributor Tobis Klangfilm. The Leuven City Archive preserves seven posters designed by Magritte.

During the early stages of his career, the British surrealist patron Edward James allowed Magritte to stay rent-free in his London home, where Magritte studied architecture and painted. James is featured in two of Magritte's works painted in 1937, Le Principe du Plaisir (The Pleasure Principle) and La Reproduction Interdite, a painting also known as Not to Be Reproduced.

During the German occupation of Belgium in World War II he remained in Brussels, which led to a break with Breton. He briefly adopted a colorful, painterly style in 1943–44, an interlude known as his "Renoir period", as a reaction to his feelings of alienation and abandonment that came with living in German-occupied Belgium.

In 1946, renouncing the violence and pessimism of his earlier work, he joined several other Belgian artists in signing the manifesto Surrealism in Full Sunlight. During 1947–48, Magritte's "Vache period", he painted in a provocative and crude Fauve style. During this time, Magritte supported himself through the production of fake Picassos, Braques, and de Chiricos—a fraudulent repertoire he was later to expand into the printing of forged banknotes during the lean postwar period. This venture was undertaken alongside his brother Paul and fellow Surrealist and "surrogate son" Marcel Mariën, to whom had fallen the task of selling the forgeries. At the end of 1948, Magritte returned to the style and themes of his pre-war surrealistic art.

In France, Magritte's work has been showcased in a number of retrospective exhibitions, most recently at the Centre Georges Pompidou (2016–2017). In the United States his work has been featured in three retrospective exhibitions: at the Museum of Modern Art in 1965, at the Metropolitan Museum of Art in 1992, and again at the Metropolitan Museum of Art in 2013. An exhibition entitled "The Fifth Season" at the San Francisco Museum of Modern Art in 2018 focused on the work of his later years.

Politically, Magritte stood to the left, and retained close ties to the Communist Party, even in the post-war years. However, he was critical of the functionalist cultural policy of the Communist left, stating that "Class consciousness is as necessary as bread; but that does not mean that workers must be condemned to bread and water and that wanting chicken and champagne would be harmful. (...) For the Communist painter, the justification of artistic activity is to create pictures that can represent mental luxury." While remaining committed to the political left, he thus advocated a certain autonomy of art. Spiritually, Magritte was an agnostic.

Popular interest in Magritte's work rose considerably in the 1960s, and his imagery has influenced pop, minimalist, and conceptual art. In 2005 he was 9th in the Walloon version of De Grootste Belg (The Greatest Belgian); in the Flemish version he was 18th.

Personal life
Magritte married Georgette Berger in June 1922. Georgette was the daughter of a butcher in Charleroi, and first met Magritte when she was 13 and he was 15. They met again seven years later in Brussels in 1920 and Georgette, who had also studied art, became Magritte's model, muse, and wife.

In 1936, Magritte's marriage became troubled when he met a young performance artist, Sheila Legge, and began an affair with her. Magritte arranged for his friend, Paul Colinet, to entertain and distract Georgette, but this led to an affair between Georgette and Colinet. Magritte and his wife did not reconcile until 1940.

Magritte died of pancreatic cancer on 15 August 1967, aged 68, and was interred in Schaerbeek Cemetery, Evere, Brussels.

Philosophical and artistic gestures

Magritte's work frequently displays a collection of ordinary objects in an unusual context, giving new meanings to familiar things. The use of objects as other than what they seem is typified in his painting, The Treachery of Images (La trahison des images), which shows a pipe that looks as though it is a model for a tobacco store advertisement. Magritte painted below the pipe "Ceci n'est pas une pipe" ("This is not a pipe"), which seems a contradiction, but is actually true: the painting is not a pipe, it is an image of a pipe. It does not "satisfy emotionally"—when Magritte was once asked about this image, he replied that of course it was not a pipe, just try to fill it with tobacco.

Magritte's work has been described by Suzi Gablik as "a systematic attempt to disrupt any dogmatic view of the physical world." Therefore, when Magritte painted rocks – which are commonly understood to be heavy, inanimate objects – he often painted them floating cloud-like in the sky, or painted scenes of people and their environment turned to stone.

Among Magritte's works are a number of surrealist versions of other famous paintings, such as Perspective I and Perspective II, which are copies of David's Portrait of Madame Récamier and Manet's The Balcony, respectively, but with the human subjects replaced by coffins.  Elsewhere, Magritte challenges the difficulty of artwork to convey meaning with a recurring motif of an easel, as in his The Human Condition series (1933, 1935) or The Promenades of Euclid (1955), wherein the spires of a castle are "painted" upon the ordinary streets which the canvas overlooks. In a letter to André Breton, he wrote of The Human Condition that it was irrelevant if the scene behind the easel differed from what was depicted upon it, "but the main thing was to eliminate the difference between a view seen from outside and from inside a room." The windows in some of these pictures are framed with heavy drapes, suggesting a theatrical motif.

Magritte's style of surrealism is more representational than the "automatic" style of artists such as Joan Miró. Magritte's use of ordinary objects in unfamiliar spaces is joined to his desire to create poetic imagery. He described the act of painting as "the art of putting colors side by side in such a way that their real aspect is effaced, so that familiar objects—the sky, people, trees, mountains, furniture, the stars, solid structures, graffiti—become united in a single poetically disciplined image. The poetry of this image dispenses with any symbolic significance, old or new."

René Magritte described his paintings as "visible images which conceal nothing; they evoke mystery and, indeed, when one sees one of my pictures, one asks oneself this simple question, 'What does that mean?'. It does not mean anything, because mystery means nothing either, it is unknowable."

Magritte's constant play with reality and illusion has been attributed to the early death of his mother. Psychoanalysts who have examined bereaved children have hypothesized that Magritte's back and forth play with reality and illusion reflects his "constant shifting back and forth from what he wishes—'mother is alive'—to what he knows—'mother is dead'." 

More recently, Patricia Allmer has demonstrated the influence of fairground attractions on Magritte's art – from carousels and circuses to panoramas and stage magic.

Artists influenced by Magritte
Contemporary artists have been greatly influenced by René Magritte's stimulating examination of the fickleness of images. Some artists who have been influenced by Magritte's works include John Baldessari, Ed Ruscha, Andy Warhol, Jasper Johns, Jan Verdoodt, Martin Kippenberger, Duane Michals, Storm Thorgerson, and Luis Rey. Some of the artists' works integrate direct references and others offer contemporary viewpoints on his abstract fixations.

Magritte's use of simple graphic and everyday imagery has been compared to that of the pop-artists. His influence in the development of pop art has been widely recognized, although Magritte himself discounted the connection. He considered the pop artists' representation of "the world as it is" as "their error", and contrasted their attention to the transitory with his concern for "the feeling for the real, insofar as it is permanent." The 2006–2007 LACMA exhibition "Magritte and Contemporary Art: The Treachery of Images" examined the relationship between Magritte and contemporary art.

Legacy

The 1960s brought a great increase in public awareness of Magritte's work. Thanks to his "sound knowledge of how to present objects in a manner both suggestive and questioning", his works have been frequently adapted or plagiarized in advertisements, posters, book covers and the like. Examples include album covers such as Beck-Ola by The Jeff Beck Group (reproducing Magritte's The Listening Room), Alan Hull's 1973 album Pipedream which used The Philosopher's Lamp, Jackson Browne's 1974 album Late for the Sky, with artwork inspired by The Empire of Light, Oregon's album Oregon referring to Carte Blanche, the Firesign Theatre's album Just Folks... A Firesign Chat based on The Mysteries of the Horizon, and Styx's album The Grand Illusion incorporating an adaptation of the painting The Blank Signature (Le Blanc Seing). The Nigerian rapper Jesse Jagz's 2014 album Jagz Nation Vol. 2: Royal Niger Company has cover art inspired by Magritte's works. In 2015 the band Punch Brothers used The Lovers as the cover of their album The Phosphorescent Blues.

The logo of Apple Corps, The Beatles' company, is inspired by Magritte's Le Jeu de Mourre, a 1966 painting. Paul Simon's song "Rene and Georgette Magritte with Their Dog after the War", inspired by a photograph of Magritte by Lothar Wolleh, appears on the 1983 album Hearts and Bones. John Cale wrote a song titled "Magritte". The song appears on the 2003 album HoboSapiens. Tom Stoppard wrote a 1970 Surrealist play called After Magritte. John Berger scripted the book Ways of Seeing using images and ideologies regarding Magritte. Douglas Hofstadter's 1979 book Gödel, Escher, Bach uses Magritte works for many of its illustrations. The Treachery of Images was used in a major plot in L. J. Smith's 1994 novel The Forbidden Game. Magritte's imagery has inspired filmmakers ranging from the surrealist Marcel Mariën to mainstream directors such as Jean-Luc Godard, Alain Robbe-Grillet, Bernardo Bertolucci, Nicolas Roeg, John Boorman and Terry Gilliam.

According to the 1998 documentary The Fear of God: 25 Years of "The Exorcist", the iconic poster shot for the film The Exorcist was inspired by Magritte's The Empire of Light.

In the 1992 movie Toys, Magritte's work was influential in the entire movie but specifically in a break-in scene, featuring Robin Williams and Joan Cusack in a music video hoax. Many of Magritte's works were used directly in that scene. In the 1999 movie The Thomas Crown Affair starring Pierce Brosnan, Rene Russo and Denis Leary, the Magritte painting The Son of Man was prominently featured as part of the plot line.

Gary Numan's 1979 album The Pleasure Principle was a reference to Magritte's painting of the same name.

In John Green's fictional novel (2012) and movie (2014), The Fault in Our Stars, the main character Hazel Grace Lancaster wears a tee shirt with Magritte's, The Treachery of Images, (This is not a pipe.) Just prior to leaving her mother to visit her favorite author, Hazel explains the drawing to her confused mother and states that the author's novel has "several Magritte references", clearly hoping the author will be pleased with the reference.

The official music video of Markus Schulz's "Koolhaus" under his Dakota guise was inspired from Magritte's works.

A street in Brussels has been named Ceci n'est pas une rue (This is not a street).

Magritte Museum and other collections

The Magritte Museum opened to the public on 30 May 2009 in Brussels. Housed in the five-level neo-classical Hotel Altenloh, on the Place Royale, it displays some 200 original Magritte paintings, drawings and sculptures including The Return, Scheherazade and The Empire of Light. This multidisciplinary permanent installation is the biggest Magritte archive anywhere and most of the work is directly from the collection of the artist's widow, Georgette Magritte, and from Irene Hamoir Scutenaire, who was his primary collector. Additionally, the museum includes Magritte's experiments with photography from 1920 on and the short Surrealist films he made from 1956 on.

Another museum is located at 135 Rue Esseghem in Brussels in Magritte's former home, where he lived with his wife from 1930 to 1954. Olympia (1948), a nude portrait of Magritte's wife reportedly worth about US$1.1 million, was stolen from this museum on the morning of 24 September 2009 by two armed men. It was returned to the museum in January 2012, in exchange for a 50,000-Euro payment from the museum's insurer. The thieves reportedly agreed to the deal because they were unable to sell the painting on the black market due to its fame. 

The Menil Collection in Houston, Texas holds one of the most significant collections of dada and surrealist work in the United States, including dozens of oil paintings, gouaches, drawings, and bronzes by René Magritte. John de Menil and Dominique de Menil initiated and funded the catalogue raisonné of Magritte's oeuvre, published between 1992 and 1997 in five volumes, with an addendum in 2012. Major oil paintings in the Menil Collection include: The Meaning of Night (1927), The Eternally Obvious (1930), The Rape (1934), The Listening Room (1952), and Golconda (1953) which are typically exhibited a few at a time on a rotating basis with other surrealist works in the collection.

Selected list of works

1919 Nude
1920 Landscape and Portrait of Pierre Bourgeois
1921 Bathers
1922 The Station and L'Écuyère
1923 Self-portrait, Sixth Nocturne, Georgette at the Piano and Donna
1925 The Bather, Reclining Nude and The Window
1926 The Lost Jockey, The Mind of the Traveler, Sensational News, The Difficult Crossing, The Vestal's Agony, The Midnight Marriage, The Musings of the Solitary Walker, After the Water, the Clouds, Popular Panorama, Landscape, Checkmate and The Encounter
 1927 The Enchanted Pose
1927 Young Girl Eating a Bird (The Pleasure), The Oasis (started in 1925), Le Double Secret, The Secret Player, The Meaning of Night, Let Out of School, The Man from the Sea (l'Homme du Large), The Tiredness of Life, The Light-breaker, A Passion for Light, The Menaced Assassin, [https://www.wikiart.org/en/rene-magritte/the-reckless-sleeper-1927 The Reckless Sleeper, La Voleuse, The Fast Hope, L'Atlantide and The Muscles of the Sky
1928 The Lining of Sleep (started in 1927), Intermission (started in 1927), The Adulation of Space (started in 1927), The Perfume of the Abyss, Discovery,  The Lovers I &The Lovers II, The Voice of Space, The False Mirror, The Daring Sleeper, The Acrobat's Ideas, The Automaton, The Empty Mask, Reckless Sleeper, The Secret Life,  The Flood and Attempting the Impossible
1929 The Treachery of Images (started in 1928), Threatening Weather and On the Threshold of Liberty
1930 Pink Belles, Tattered Skies, The Eternally Obvious, The Lifeline, The Annunciation and Celestial Perfections
1931 The Voice of the Air, Summer and The Giantess
1932 The Universe Unmasked
1933 Elective Affinities, The Human Condition and The Unexpected Answer
1934 The Rape
1935 The Discovery of Fire, The Human Condition, The Rape, Revolution, Perpetual Motion, Collective Invention and The Portrait
1936 Surprise Answer, Clairvoyance, The Healer, The Philosopher's Lamp, The Heart Revealed a portrait of Tita Thirifays, Spiritual Exercises, Portrait of Irène Hamoir, La Méditation and Forbidden Literature
1937 The Future of Statues, The Black Flag, Not to be Reproduced, Portrait of Edward James and Portrait of Rena Schitz, On the Threshold of Liberty
1938 Time Transfixed, The Domain of Arnheim, Steps of Summer and Stimulation Objective
1939 Victory, The Palace of Memories
1940 The Return, The Wedding Breakfast and Les Grandes Espérances
1941 The Break in the Clouds
1942 Misses de L'Isle Adam, L'Île au Trésor, Memory, Black Magic, Les compagnons de la peur and The Misanthropes
1943 The Return of the Flame, The Fire, Universal Gravitation, The Harvest, La cinquième saison and Monsieur Ingres's Good Days
1944 The Good Omens
1945 Treasure Island, Les Rencontres Naturelles, La Bonne Fortune and Black Magic
1946 L'Intelligence and Les Mille et une Nuits
1947 La Philosophie dans le boudoir, The Cicerone, The Liberator, The Fair Captive, La Part du Feu and The Red Model
1948 Blood Will Tell, Memory, The Mountain Dweller, The Art of Life, The Pebble,  The Lost Jockey, God's Solon, Shéhérazade, L'Ellipse,  Les Profondeurs du Plaisir and Famine and The Taste of Sorrow
1949 Megalomania, Elementary Cosmogony, and Perspective, the Balcony
1950 Making an Entrance, The Legend of the Centuries, Towards Pleasure, The Labors of Alexander, The Empire of Light II, The Fair Captive, The Art of Conversation, The Survivor and Perspective II, Manet's Balcony
1951 David's Madame Récamier (parodying the Portrait of Madame Récamier), Pandora's Box, The Song of the Violet, The Spring Tide and The Smile
1952 Personal Values and Le Sens de la Pudeur and The Explanation 
1953 Golconda, The Listening Room and a fresco, The Enchanted Domain, for the Knokke Casino, Le chant des sirènes
1954 The Invisible World and The Empire of Light
1955 Memory of a Journey and The Mysteries of the Horizon
1956 The Sixteenth of September; The Ready-made Bouquet
1957 The Fountain of Youth; The Enchanted Domain
1958 The Golden Legend, Hegel's Holiday, The Banquet, La Toile de Pénélope and The Familiar World
1959 The Castle of the Pyrenees, The Battle of the Argonne, The Anniversary, The Month of the Grape Harvest and La clef de verre (The Glass Key)
1960 The Memoirs of a Saint
1962 The Great Table, The Healer, Waste of Effort, Le Domaine d'Arnheim, Mona Lisa (circa 1962) and L'embellie (circa 1962)
1963 The Great Family, The Open Air, The Beautiful Season, Princes of the Autumn, Young Love, La Recherche de la Vérité and The Telescope and " The Art of Conversation"
1964 Le soir qui tombe (Evening Falls), The Great War, The Great War on Facades, The Son of Man and Song of Love
1965 Le Blanc-Seing,Carte Blanche, The Thought Which Sees, Ages Ago and The Beautiful Walk (circa 1965), Good Faith
1966 The Shades, The Happy Donor, The Gold Ring, The Pleasant Truth, The Two Mysteries, The Pilgrim, Decalcomania and The Mysteries of the Horizon
1967 Les Grâces Naturelles, La Géante, The Blank Page, Good Connections, The Art of Living, L'Art de Vivre and several bronze sculptures based on Magritte's previous works

See also

 Magritte Museum, part of the Royal Museum of Fine Arts of Belgium.
 René Magritte Museum, a museum in Jette in Brussels, in the house where Magritte lived and worked for 24 years, between 1930 and 1954.
 List of Belgian painters
 List of paintings by Rene Magritte

References 

Citations

Bibliography

Abadie, Daniel and Galerie nationale du jeu de paume (2003). Magritte. New York: Distributed Art Publishers. .

Allmer, Patricia (2017) This Is Magritte London: Laurence King. 

 Allmer, Patricia (2007). 'Dial M for Magritte' in "Johan Grimonprez - Looking for Alfred", eds. Steven Bode and Thomas Elsaesser, London: Film and Video Umbrella.
 Allmer, Patricia (2007). 'René Magritte and the Postcard' in "Collective Inventions: Surrealism in Belgium Reconsidered", eds. Patricia Allmer and Hilde van Gelder, Leuven: Leuven University Press. 
 Allmer, Patricia (2007). 'Failing to Create - Magritte, Artistry, Art History' in From Self to Shelf: The Artist Under Construction, ed. William May, Cambridge: Cambridge Scholars Publishing. 
 Allmer, Patricia (2006). 'Framing the Real: Frames and the Process of Framing in René Magritte's Œuvre', in Framing Borders in Literature and Other Media, eds. Walter Bernhart and Werner Wolf, Amsterdam: Rodopi. 

Gablik, Suzi (1970). Magritte. London: Thames & Hudson. .

Levy, Silvano (1996). 'René Magritte: Representational Iconoclasm', in Surrealist Visuality, ed. S. Levy, Keele University Press. .
Levy, Silvano (2012). 'Magritte et le refus de l'authentique', Cycnos, Vol. 28, No. 1 (July 2012), pp. 53–62. .
Levy, Silvano (2005). 'Magritte at the Edge of Codes', Image & Narrative, No. 13 (November 2005), Magritte at the Edge of Codes by Silvano Levy  .
Levy, Silvano (1993). 'Magritte, Mesens and Dada', Aura, No. 1, 11 pp. 31 41. . 
Levy, Silvano (1993). 'Magritte: The Uncanny and the Image', French Studies Bulletin, No. 46, 3 pp. 15 17. . 
Levy, Silvano (1992). 'Magritte and Words', Journal of European Studies, Vol. 22, Part 4, No. 88, 19 pp. 313 321. . 
Levy, Silvano (1992). 'Magritte and the Surrealist Image', Apollo, Vol. CXXXVI, No. 366, 3 pp 117 119. .
Levy, Silvano (1990). 'Foucault on Magritte on Resemblance', Modern Language Review, Vol. 85, No.1, 7 pp. 50 56. . 
Levy, Silvano (1981). 'René Magritte and Window Display', Artscribe International, No. 28, 5 pp. 24 28. .
Levy, Silvano (1992). 'This is a Magritte', The Times Higher Education Supplement, No. 1,028, 17 July 1992, 1 p. 18. .

External links

Foundation Magritte
The biography and works of René Magritte
René Magritte Museum in Brussels

Magritte at Artcyclopedia
René Magritte: The Pleasure Principle – Exhibition at Tate Liverpool, UK 2011
Musée Magritte Museum at Brussels
A visit to the Musée Magritte Museum
Patricia Allmer, "La Reproduction Interdite: René Magritte and Forgery" in Papers of Surrealism, Issue 5, Spring 2007.
Cinema Leuven - Film posters designed by Emair/René Magritte

 
1898 births
1967 deaths
People from Lessines
Deaths from pancreatic cancer
Belgian agnostics
Belgian artists
Belgian communists
Surrealist artists
Deaths from cancer in Belgium
Modern painters
Belgian surrealist artists
Walloon people
20th-century Belgian painters
Burials at Schaerbeek Cemetery
Académie Royale des Beaux-Arts alumni
Belgian Army personnel